The 16th Engineer Brigade is a combat engineer brigade of the United States Army National Guard of Ohio. The brigade is responsible for a number of units throughout Ohio, most of which are also combat engineer units.

Overview
Members of the brigade provide construction and design assistance for nations worldwide, both in aid to civilian authorities and traditional training environments. The HHC 16th Engineer Brigade, mobilized into federal active duty in June 2020 in support of Operation Spartan Shield, Task Force Iron Castle.

Honors
 
CAMPAIGN PARTICIPATION CREDIT

World War I

Lorraine 1918

World War II

Northern Solomons

Luzon (with arrowhead)

War on Terrorism

Iraq

Iraq Governance

National Resolution
 
Iraqi Sovereignty

DECORATIONS

Presidential Unit Citation (Army),
Streamer embroidered BOUGAINVILLE

Philippine Presidential Unit Citation, Streamer embroidered 17 OCTOBER 1944 TO 4 JULY 1945 
 
Meritorious Unit Citation (Army), Streamer embroidered IRAQ 2005-2006
 
Meritorious Unit Commendation (Army), Streamer embroidered IRAQ 2009 - 2010

Organization

HHC, 16TH EN BDE

204th EN DET

HHC, 216TH EN BN

SPT CO

1194th EN CO

811th EN CO SAPPER

1191st EN CO

1137th SIG CO

HHC, 112th EN BN

SPT CO

812th EN CO SAPPER

945th EN CO

192nd EN CO

291st EN DET

292nd EN DET

5694th EN DET

295th EN DET

296th EN DET

HHC, 5th BN, 54th SFAB

A CO

B CO

C CO

D CO

Lineage
Parent unit constituted 29 August 1917 in the National Guard as Headquarters, 62d Field Artillery Brigade, an element of the 37th Division

Organized on 21 September 1917 at Camp Sherman, Ohio, with personnel from the Ohio National Guard

	Demobilized on 11 April 1919 at Camp Sherman, Ohio

	Expanded, reorganized, and Federally recognized in the Ohio National Guard as elements of the 37th Division as follows:
		
		Headquarters, 62d Field Artillery Brigade 26 July 1922 at Columbus 
	(location changed on 1 June 1937 to Cleveland) 
		Headquarters Battery, 62d Field Artillery Brigade, 26 April 1922 at 
Dayton (hereafter, separate lineage)

	Inducted into Federal service on 15 October 1940 at Columbus

	Reorganized and redesignated 1 February 1942 as Headquarters, 37th Division Artillery

	Inactivated on 18 December 1945 at Camp Anza, California

	Consolidated 11 November 1946 with the 37th Reconnaissance Troop, Mechanized (see ANNEX); consolidated unit Federally recognized as Headquarters and Headquarters Battery, 37th Division Artillery

	Ordered into active Federal service on 15 January 1952 at Columbus

	(Headquarters and Headquarters Battery, 37th Division Artillery [NGUS] organized and Federally recognized 15 January 1954)

	Released from active Federal service on 15 June 1954 and reverted to state control; Federal recognition was concurrently withdrawn from Headquarters and Headquarters Battery, 37th Division Artillery (NGUS)

Redesignated 1 September 1959 as Headquarters and Headquarters Battery, 37th Infantry Division Artillery

	Converted and redesignated 15 February 1968 as Headquarters and Headquarters Company, 16th Engineer Brigade and relieved from assignment to the 37th Infantry Division

	Ordered into active Federal service 10 September 2005 at Columbus; released from active Federal service 8 March 2007 and reverted to state control

	Ordered into active Federal service on 31 August 2009 at Columbus; released from active Federal service 4 October 2010 and reverted to state control

	Ordered into active Federal service on 25 June 2020 at Columbus 	

ANNEX

	Organized and Federally recognized on 29 April 1921 in the Ohio National Guard at Columbus as Headquarters Company, 2d Infantry Brigade

	Reorganized and redesignated 1 July 1921 as Headquarters Company, 74th Infantry Brigade an element of the 37th Division (later redesignated as the 37th Infantry Division)

	Inducted into Federal service on 15 October 1940 at Columbus

	Converted and redesignated on 1 February 1942 as the 37th Cavalry Reconnaissance Troop

	Reorganized and redesignated on 1 June 1944 as the 37th Reconnaissance Troop, Mechanized

	Inactivated on 13 December 1945 at Camp Stoneman, California

References
GlobalSecurity.org: 16th Engineer Brigade

Engineer 016
Ohio National Guard units